Bin Ghanem cabinet was the cabinet of Yemen formed by Faraj Said Bin Ghanem from 15 September 1997 to 15 May 1998.

List of ministers

See also 

 Politics of Yemen

References 

Cabinets of Yemen
1997 establishments in Yemen
Bin Ghanem Cabinet